The ALCO Century 630 is a model of six-axle,  diesel-electric locomotive built by the American Locomotive Company (ALCO) between 1965 and 1967.  It used the ALCO 251 prime mover.  77 were built: 3 for Atlantic Coast Line Railroad, 4 for Chesapeake and Ohio Railway, 8 for Louisville and Nashville Railroad, 10 (with high noses) for Norfolk and Western Railway, 15 for Pennsylvania Railroad, 12 for the Reading Company, 15 for Southern Pacific Railroad and 10 for Union Pacific Railroad.

Montreal Locomotive Works produced a C630M variant of the C630, with 4 for British Columbia Railway, 8 for Canadian Pacific Railway and 44 for Canadian National. MLW M630s were built by Montreal Locomotive Works from 1969 to 1973: 29 for CPR, 26 for BCR, and 20 for Ferrocarriles Nacional de Mexico (N de M). Eight of the BCR locomotives were designated M630(W) and were built with a wide-nosed cab, known as the "Canadian" or "safety" cab.  The latter two models, along with the nearly identical MLW M636, had more in common with the ALCO C636 than the C630, and all MLW versions rode on high-adhesion trucks cast by Dofasco.

In January 1975, four Chesapeake and Ohio Railway locomotives were sold to Robe River Iron Associates in the Pilbara region of Western Australia. One was destroyed in an accident in February 1979, with the remaining three rebuilt by A Goninan & Co, Perth as CM40-8s in the early 1990s.

Many C630s are still in service with the Western New York & Pennsylvania Railroad, Delaware-Lackawanna Railroad and other short line railroads.

See also
List of ALCO diesel locomotives
List of MLW diesel locomotives

References

External links
Sarberenyi, Robert. Alco C630 Original Owners.
American-Rails.com profile of the Alco C630.

Century 630
C-C locomotives
Diesel-electric locomotives of the United States
Diesel locomotives of Western Australia
Century 630
Railway locomotives introduced in 1965
Standard gauge locomotives of Canada
Standard gauge locomotives of the United States
Standard gauge locomotives of Mexico
Diesel-electric locomotives of Australia
Diesel-electric locomotives of Canada
Diesel-electric locomotives of Mexico